The 88th Infantry Division (88. Infanterie-Division) was a formation of the Imperial German Army in World War I. The division was formed in November 1914 as the Menges Division (Division Menges), named after its commander, and made up primarily of Landwehr troops. It became the 88th Infantry Division in August 1915. The division was disbanded in 1919 during the demobilization of the German Army after World War I.

Combat chronicle

The Menges Division initially served on the Eastern Front, receiving its baptism of fire in the Battle of Łódź. In 1915, it participated in the Gorlice-Tarnów Offensive, breaking through at Przaznysz and fighting in the battle on the Narew. On August 2, 1915, it became the 88th Infantry Division. From November 1915 to December 1917, the division occupied the line near Daugavpils. In December 1917, after the armistice on the Eastern Front, the division was transferred to the Western Front, where it entered the line in positions near St. Quentin and on the Oise. It participated in the 1918 German spring offensive, fighting in the First Battle of the Somme (1918), also known as the Battle of St. Quentin or the Second Battle of the Somme (to distinguish it from the 1916 battle). From April to July 1918, it was in the line in the Champagne region, and then fought in the Second Battle of the Marne. Except for minor periods, it remained in the Champagne region until the end of the war, and faced the Allied Meuse-Argonne Offensive in October and November 1918. Allied intelligence rated the division as fourth class.

Order of battle on formation

The 88th Infantry Division was formed as an overstrength square division, with three infantry brigades. The order of battle of the division on August 2, 1915, was as follows:

175. Landwehr-Infanterie-Brigade
Landwehr-Infanterie-Regiment Nr. 349
Landwehr-Infanterie-Regiment Nr. 350
176. Infanterie-Brigade
Infanterie-Regiment Nr. 351
Infanterie-Regiment Nr. 352
177. Infanterie-Brigade
Infanterie-Regiment Nr. 353
Infanterie-Regiment Nr. 354
Kavallerie-Regiment Nr. 88
Feldartillerie-Regiment Nr. 88
Landwehr-Fußartillerie-Bataillon Nr. 6
Landwehr-Pionier-Bataillon Nr. 6

Late-war order of battle

The division underwent a number of organizational changes over the course of the war. It was triangularized in the summer of 1916. Cavalry was reduced, artillery and signals commands were formed, and combat engineer support was expanded to a full pioneer battalion. The order of battle on October 21, 1918, was as follows:

176. Infanterie-Brigade
Infanterie-Regiment Nr. 352
Infanterie-Regiment Nr. 353
Infanterie-Regiment Nr. 426
1. Eskadron/ Jäger-Regiment zu Pferde Nr. 10
Artillerie-Kommandeur 59
Feldartillerie-Regiment Nr. 88
Fußartillerie-Bataillon Nr. 123
Stab Pionier-Bataillon Nr. 88
3. Reserve-Kompanie/ Pionier-Bataillon Nr. 33
Pionier-Kompanie Nr. 249
Minenwerfer-Kompanie Nr. 88
Divisions-Nachrichten-Kommandeur 88

References
 Division Menges (Chronik 1914/1915) - Der erste Weltkrieg
 88. Infanterie-Division (Chronik 1915/1918) - Der erste Weltkrieg
 Hermann Cron et al., Ruhmeshalle unserer alten Armee (Berlin, 1935)
 Hermann Cron, Geschichte des deutschen Heeres im Weltkriege 1914-1918 (Berlin, 1937)
 Günter Wegner, Stellenbesetzung der deutschen Heere 1825-1939. (Biblio Verlag, Osnabrück, 1993), Bd. 1
 Histories of Two Hundred and Fifty-One Divisions of the German Army which Participated in the War (1914-1918), compiled from records of Intelligence section of the General Staff, American Expeditionary Forces, at General Headquarters, Chaumont, France 1919 (1920)

Notes

Infantry divisions of Germany in World War I
Military units and formations established in 1914
Military units and formations disestablished in 1919
1914 establishments in Germany